Novomalyklinsky District  is an administrative and municipal district (raion), one of the twenty-one in Ulyanovsk Oblast, Russia. It is located in the northeast of the oblast. Its administrative center is the rural locality (a selo) of Novaya Malykla. Population: 15,379 (2010 Census);  The population of Novaya Malykla accounts for 21.3% of the district's total population.

References

Notes

Sources

Districts of Ulyanovsk Oblast